The Biscuitville 125 was a NASCAR K&N Pro Series East race held annually at Virginia International Raceway in Danville, Virginia. The race was  race. The inaugural event was held in 2013 with last happening in the 2016 season.

History
The event replaced a previous K&N race at CNB Bank Raceway Park on the schedule.

Past winners

 2013-15: Race extended due to a green-white-checker finish.

References

External links
VIR at NASCAR Home Tracks
 

ARCA Menards Series East
Former NASCAR races